Elżbieta Ewa Bieńkowska (née Moycho; born on 4 February 1964 in Katowice) is a Polish politician who served as Poland's Deputy Prime Minister and Minister of Regional Development and Transport before being nominated as European Commissioner by Jean-Claude Juncker in 2014.

Bieńkowska was Minister of Regional Development in Prime Minister Donald Tusk's Cabinet from 16 November 2007 until 27 November 2013, when she was appointed Deputy Prime Minister of Poland while continuing her previous responsibilities at the Ministry of Infrastructure and Development.

Education
Bieńkowska graduated from Jagiellonian University with a Master's degree in Oriental Philology in 1989. She has also received a post-graduate Diploma from the Polish National School of Public Administration and afterwards a postgraduate studies MBA from SGH Warsaw School of Economics.

Professional career
Bieńkowska's career in public administration started at Katowice City Council where she worked on regional contracts being promoted, in 1999, as head of Katowice's Department for Economy. Later that year, she was appointed Director of Regional Development for the Silesian Voivodeship, where she served until 2007.

Career in politics
Bieńkowska describes herself as a technocrat. She is not a party member, and was elected to the Senate of Poland in 2011 as an independent candidate, backed by the Civic Platform.
 
In the government of Prime Minister Donald Tusk, Bieńkowska served as Minister for Infrastructure and Development for Poland, as well as Deputy Prime Minister from the end of 2013 until the end of September 2014. In this capacity, she was charge of allocating European Union funding and the country's transport infrastructure. Under her leadership, the ministry was Poland's second-largest department after the ministry of finance, with 1,600 employees and nine deputy ministers. In February 2013, she secured €105.8 billion from the EU budget for 2014-20.

On 3 September 2014, Bieńkowska was announced as the Polish nominee to the European Commission, in place of foreign affairs minister Radek Sikorski, who had been put forward in August in a bid to secure the post of High Representative of the Union for Foreign Affairs and Security Policy.

On 10 September 2014, Juncker designated Bieńkowska as European Commissioner for Internal Market, Industry, Entrepreneurship and SMEs, following which, on 1 November 2014, she took office in the Juncker Commission.

Since 2015, Bieńkowska has been chairing the European Commission's High-level Group of Personalities on Defence Research.

Honours and decorations
  - Commander (with Sash), Royal Norwegian Order of Merit
  - Fire Service Medal (Gold), Katowice

Personal life
Bieńkowska is married and has three children.

See also
 Bieńkowski coat of arms

References

External links
 www.premier.gov.pl
 www.elections2014.eu
 Bieńkowski / Princess Radziwiłł marriage
 www.fakt.pl

|-

|-

|-

|-

}
|-

1964 births
Deputy Prime Ministers of Poland
Government ministers of Poland
Jagiellonian University alumni
Living people
National School of Public Administration (Poland) alumni
People from the Province of Silesia
Polish European Commissioners
Politicians from Katowice
Transport ministers of Poland
Women European Commissioners
Women government ministers of Poland
European Commissioners 2014–2019
21st-century Polish women politicians